Kirkandrews-on-Esk is a civil parish in the Carlisle district of Cumbria, England.  It contains 13 listed buildings that are recorded in the National Heritage List for England.  Of these, three are listed at Grade II*, the middle of the three grades, and the others are at Grade II, the lowest grade. The parish is almost completely rural.  The listed buildings consist of two farmhouses, a former tower house with associated structures, a former toll house, a church, a railway viaduct, and six milestones.


Key

Buildings

References

Citations

Sources

Lists of listed buildings in Cumbria